Thames Travel is a bus operator serving the southern part of the English county of Oxfordshire. It is based in Didcot and is a subsidiary of the Go-Ahead Group.

In May 2011 the Go-Ahead Group bought Thames Travel.

Branded routes

River Rapids

Early in its history Thames Travel began a direct bus service between Oxford and Reading via Wallingford. This comprises two routes: the X40 which runs via Woodcote, and the X39 which bypasses Woodcote. The company also operates a service to Henley-on-Thames and Wallingford, which until 2017 was numbered 139, ran seven days a week and terminated at Wallingford.

At the end of October 2017 Thames Travel withdrew the Sunday service from route 139, but extended the Monday to Saturday service from Wallingford to Oxford and renumbered the revised route X38. It retimetabled the X38, X39 and X40 to provide a service every 20 minutes between Wallingford and Oxford. It has branded the three routes "River Rapids" and applied prominent graphics to its dedicated fleet to promote it.

Connector

The Connector brand is used for Didcot focused services, and covers routes between Didcot and Oxford, Abingdon, Henley-on-Thames, Wallingford, Wantage, Grove, East Hanney, Harwell Campus, JR Hospital, Great Western Park and Milton Park. The Connector brand also covers the Science Transit Shuttle, which operates between Oxford and Harwell Campus and between Wytham and the JR Hospital, under contract from the University of Oxford.
The Connector routes have a dedicated fleet in a livery of two-tone grey with a light green coachline, and "Connector" graphics promoting the route.

Fleet
As of November 2022 the fleet comprised 74 vehicles: 45 double-decker buses, 27 single-deck buses and two vans. The fleet is now numbered in the Oxford Bus Company series.

Depots
Thames Travel's depot is in Didcot, with a capacity for more than 100 buses. Weavaway coaches rents space from Thames Travel in their depot. It also has out-stations in Reading and at Oxford Bus Company's depot in Oxford. The outstation in Reading is at the Reading Buses depot and currently has one vehicle based there for route 143.

Notable incidents
Thames Travel vehicles have been involved in three major accidents, reported in the local media. All were on the A4074 road, nicknamed locally the "13 bends of death".

The first accident was on 21 July 2006. A 26-year-old woman was killed when her car collided head-on with a Thames Travel bus. It was found that the woman was taking avoiding action to prevent her car from colliding with two cars that were coming towards her, whose drivers had been recklessly overtaking numerous other cars before the accident. As a result of the collision both vehicles caught fire and were completely destroyed. The two brothers arrested after the incident were convicted and jailed for a total of 15 years for the accident.

The second accident was on 28 January 2008. A Thames Travel single-decker bus collided in fog with a Land Rover that was turning off the road across the bus's path. The Land Rover landed on its side; the bus in a ditch. The accident was on the A4074 at its junction with the B4526 road. Five people were injured.

The third accident was on 14 October 2014. A Thames Travel bus collided with a van on the A4074, leaving the bus driver and a passenger injured.

See also
 List of bus companies in the United Kingdom

References

External links

 Thames Travel official website
  – weekly local bus news, archived from October 2002 onward

1998 establishments in England
British companies established in 1998
Bus operators in Berkshire
Bus operators in Oxfordshire
Transport companies established in 1998
Transport in Reading, Berkshire